Klubi Futbollit Erzeni Shijak is an Albanian football club based in Shijak. They currently compete in the Kategoria Superiore, which is the first tier of Albanian football, and they play their home games at the Tefik Jashari Stadium.

History
Founded in 1931, Erzeni had three seasons in the Kategoria Superiore, the top tier of the Albanian football pyramid, between 2000 and 2003.

Return to Kategoria Superiore
The club was promoted back to the top tier of Albanian Football after finishing as runners-up in the 2021–22 Kategoria e Parë, behind winners Bylis.

Current squad

Historical list of coaches

 Agim Murati
 Saimir Dauti (2000-2001)
 Tiziano Gori (2001)
 Xhokhi Puka (2001-2002)
 Derviš Hadžiosmanović (2002)
 Petrit Haxhia (2003)
 Derviš Hadžiosmanović (2004-2005)
 Stavri Nica (August 2015 — December 2015)
 Dorjan Bubeqi (July 2016 — January 2018)
 Nevil Dede (10 January 2018 — 23 January 2018)
 Gentian Stojku (2018 — February 2019)
 Gentian Begeja (February 2019 — September 2019)
 Vladimir Gjoni (October 2019 — December 2019)
 Nevil Dede (28 June 2021 — 1 July 2022)
 Xhevair Kapllani (1 July 2022 — )

References

External links
First Division Standing and Stats
Albania Sport

Erzeni Shijak
Erzeni Shijak
1931 establishments in Albania
Shijak
Sport in Durrës
Kategoria e Dytë clubs